Bimorphic can refer to:
 Bimorphism, a type of mapping in mathematics
 Bimorph, a piezoelectric cantilever with two active layers